Bebearia cottoni is a butterfly in the family Nymphalidae. It is found in the Democratic Republic of the Congo (the central basin).

References

Butterflies described in 1908
cottoni
Endemic fauna of the Democratic Republic of the Congo
Butterflies of Africa